Siegfried Köhler is the name of:

 Siegfried Köhler (conductor) (1923–2017), German conductor and composer of classical music
 Siegfried Köhler (composer) (1927–1984), German composer of classical music and songs
 Siegfried Köhler (cyclist) (born 1935), German cyclist

See also 
 Köhler